was a minelayer (later converted to survey ship) of the Imperial Japanese Navy (IJN) serving during World War I and World War II, the only ship of her class. She was the first purpose-built ocean-minelayer in the Japanese Navy.

Background
In 1914, with the start of World War I, the Empire of Japan joined the Allies as part of its obligations under the Anglo-Japanese Alliance. However, the Imperial Japanese Navy did not possess an ocean minelayer to protect its harbors from the threat of the Imperial German Navy, only a number of small boats which had been remodeled to carry naval mines. In 1915, a rush order was placed for a purpose-built ocean-minelayer, with the costs to be covered under the Eight-six Fleet program as part of the s.

Katsuriki was laid down at Kure Naval Arsenal on 15 May 1916, launched on 5 October 1916 and completed 15 January 1917.

Service history

World War I and Interwar period
Katsuriki Maru was completed in time for the final stages of World War I, when the threat of German attack on Japanese harbors was negligible. She was retained around the Japanese home islands for the duration of the war.

On 1 April 1920, she was classified to a utility vessel and renamed Katsuriki. She served on occasion as a guard ship around various islands in Japan's recent acquired South Pacific Mandate in the 1920s, and also functioned during the period on maritime surveying duties.

On 1 July 1935, the remaining minelaying equipment was removed, and surveying devices from the retired survey ship  were installed, and she was officially reclassified as a survey vessel. During the Second Sino-Japanese War from 1937, she undertook many survey missions along the coast of China. In 1938, she is known to have surveyed the Spratly Islands, at the time claimed by French Indochina . She also was part of the IJN 5th Fleet during the invasion of Hainan from 9–11 February 1939 . From October 1941, she was deployed to Kwajalein in the Marshall Islands, and surveyed the vicinity of Tarawa in the Gilbert Islands.

Pacific War
With the start of World War II, Katsuriki was re-designated as a “secret military vessel” on 20 July 1942, although her mission remained that of maritime surveying. She was sent to map the coasts of the Strait of Malacca, Indian Ocean, Burma, Singapore, the Dutch East Indies and north coast of New Guinea in support of Japanese troop landings and combat operations .

Lookouts on the USS Haddo spotted about 40 survivors in the water, and attempted to rescue, but the Japanese drowned themselves. On 10 November 1944, Katsuriki was removed from the Navy List .

References

 Ships of the World special issue Vol.47 Auxiliary Vessels of the Imperial Japanese Navy, Kaijinsha, (Japan), March 1997
 The Maru Special, Japanese Naval Vessels No.34, Japanese auxiliary vessels, Ushio Shobō (Japan), December 1979
 The Maru Special, Japanese Naval Vessels No.42, Japanese minelayers, Ushio Shobō (Japan), August 1980
 Senshi Sōsho Vol.31, Naval armaments and war preparation (1), "Until November 1941", Asagumo Simbun (Japan), November 1969

External links

Notes

Ships built by Kure Naval Arsenal
Survey ships
1916 ships
World War I naval ships of Japan
World War II naval ships of Japan
Minelayers of the Imperial Japanese Navy
Ships sunk by American submarines
World War II shipwrecks in the South China Sea
Ships lost with all hands
Maritime incidents in September 1944